The Socialist Trade and Labor Alliance of the United States and Canada – commonly abbreviated STLA or ST&LA – was a revolutionary socialist labor union in the United States closely linked to the Socialist Labor Party (SLP), which existed from 1895 until becoming a part of the Industrial Workers of the World at its founding in 1905.

History

The idea to found the Socialist Trade and Labor Alliance likely came from Daniel DeLeon, a leader in the Socialist Labor Party. Before 1895, DeLeon and the SLP had worked within the Knights of Labor, but then they were driven out. On December 6, 1895, members of the Knights met in New York City to found the STLA. At the following convention of the SLP in 1896, it formally endorsed the Socialist Trade and Labor Alliance. Hugo Vogt represented the labor union at the convention and promised that it would "not be affiliated with any capitalist party and will not support any political action except that of the Socialist Labor Party."

The organization of the STLA was very similar to that of the Knights of Labor. It differed from the American Labor Union and the IWW, which it would later become a part of, in that it was not structured industrially. It radically resented the established trade unions, like the American Federation of Labor; its Declaration of Principles asserted that "the methods and spirit of labor organization are absolutely impotent to resist the aggressions of organized capital".

The union was, however, never able to reach a mass following. Even at the most liberal estimate, it never had more than 15,000 members. It did not organize or control any large factories and was only able to organize one significant strike – in Slatersville, Rhode Island (now part of North Smithfield), which was, however, a great failure. In 1905, at that union's founding convention, the STLA became a part of the Industrial Workers of the World, an industrial union. Some in the IWW feared that DeLeon, who became an important leader in the organization, would attempt to make it a shadow of the SLP, as the STLA had been. In 1908, the IWW was split and DeLeon and some of his fellow STLA members left it.

Conventions

{|class="wikitable"
|-
!Number
!Dates of convention
!Location
!Delegates
|-
!style="text-align:center;"| First
|style="text-align:center;"| July 5–?, 1896
|style="text-align:center;"| New York City
|style="text-align:center;"| 
|-
!style="text-align:center;"| Second
|style="text-align:center;"| July 5–?, 1897
|style="text-align:center;"| Boston
|style="text-align:center;"| 
|-
!style="text-align:center;"| Third
|style="text-align:center;"| July 4–7, 1898
|style="text-align:center;"| Buffalo
|style="text-align:center;"| 
|-
!style="text-align:center;"| Fourth
|style="text-align:center;"| Sept. 18–?, 1899
|style="text-align:center;"| New York City
|style="text-align:center;"| 
|-
!style="text-align:center;"| Fifth
|style="text-align:center;"| Sept. 19–?, 1900
|style="text-align:center;"| Pittsburgh
|style="text-align:center;"| 55
|-
!style="text-align:center;"| Sixth?
|style="text-align:center;"| Dec. 4, 1902
|style="text-align:center;"| Hartford
|style="text-align:center;"| 
|}

Archives 
 Guide to the Socialist Labor Party Records, 1877–1907. Collection Number: 5168. Kheel Center for Labor-Management Documentation and Archives, Cornell University Library. Consist of the official records of the Socialist Labor Party from its organization in 1877 until 1907. Retrieved September 19, 2006.

Articles 
  Editorial: The Socialist Trade & Labor Alliance. By Daniel De Leon. The People, New York, Sunday December 15, 1895. DeLeon article on the split from the Knights of Labor. Archived by the Marxists Internet Archive. Retrieved September 19, 2006.
 The Socialist Trade & Labor Alliance versus the ‘Pure and Simple’ Trade Union: A Debate at the Grand Opera House, New Haven, Conn., November 25, 1900, between Daniel De Leon representing the Socialist Trade & Labor Alliance and the Socialist Labor Party, and Job Harriman, representing the "Pure and Simple" Trade Union and the Social Democratic Party. Daily People, Vol. I, No. 155. Sunday, December 2, 1900. 44 Page Document of contemporary debate. Retrieved September 19, 2006.
 Preceding the ST&LA. Daily People. Vol. X, No. 1.  July 3, 1910. By "X. L. Y., New York". Socialist Labor Party perspective on formation of ST&LA. Retrieved September 19, 2006.

See also

 Labor federation competition in the U.S.

References
 Brissenden, Paul Frederick: "The I.W.W.: A Study of American Syndicalism". New York: Columbia University Press. Pg. 47–49.

External links
Constitution of the Socialist Trade & Labor Alliance of the United States and Canada

Defunct trade unions in the United States
De Leonist organizations
History of the Industrial Workers of the World
1895 establishments in New York City
Organizations disestablished in 1905
Syndicalist trade unions
Trade unions established in 1895
Industrial Workers of the World in the United States